Alfred Charles Smith (October 8, 1893 – February 4, 1962) was an American lawyer and Democratic politician who served as a member of the Virginia Senate, representing the state's 3rd district.

An investigation was commenced in 1926 after Smith was accused of committing forgery in South Carolina and Virginia. He became the subject of expulsion hearings, and on the night of March 10, he was removed from office. One year later, Smith received the seat back and served the remainder of his term.

In August 1938, Smith was sentenced to eight years in prison following a conviction for fraudulently obtaining funds as an agent for the Mutual Benefit Life Insurance Company. He died in Atlanta in 1962.

References

External links

1893 births
1962 deaths
Democratic Party members of the Virginia House of Delegates
Democratic Party Virginia state senators
Politicians from Columbia, South Carolina
Wofford College alumni
American military personnel of World War I
Lawyers from Columbia, South Carolina
20th-century American politicians